César Omar Monasterio (born 28 November 1963) is an Argentine professional golfer.

Monasterio was born in Tucumán. He turned professional in 1990.

Since 2003 Monasterio has played extensively in Europe on the European Tour and its development tour, the Challenge Tour. He won the 2005 Abierto Telefonica Moviles de Guatemala on the Challenge Tour, and in 2006 captured his first European Tour title at the Aa St Omer Open, which was an official money event on both tours.

Professional wins (12)

European Tour wins (1)

1Dual-ranking event with the Challenge Tour

Challenge Tour wins (2)

1Co-sanctioned by the Tour de las Américas
2Dual-ranking event with the European Tour

Challenge Tour playoff record (1–1)

TPG Tour wins (2)

Other wins (8)
1994 Abierto del Litoral (Arg)
1996 Palermo Grand Prix (Arg)
1997 Praderas Grand Prix (Arg)
1999 Abierto del Litoral (Arg)
2002 Acantilados Grand Prix (Arg), Santiago Open (Chile), Santiago del Estero Open (Arg)
2010 Viña del Mar Open (Chi)

European Senior Tour wins (1)

Team appearances
Professional
World Cup (representing Argentina): 1995

References

External links

Argentine male golfers
European Tour golfers
European Senior Tour golfers
PGA Tour Champions golfers
Sportspeople from San Miguel de Tucumán
1963 births
Living people